Alan Neil (born 27 January 1957) is an Australian former rugby league footballer who played in the 1970s and 1980s.

Playing career
A ginger headed halfback, Neil was a regular first grade player during the late 1970 and early 1980s. He played six seasons for Western Suburbs between 1977 and 1982, and became the club halfback after Tommy Raudonikis moved to the Newtown club in 1980.

He also was the first grade halfback for the Eastern Suburbs Roosters for two seasons between 1983 and 1984, and finished his career at the St. George Dragons in 1985.  Neil was a reserve in the 1985 Grand Final.
Alan Neil was the elder brother of former Balmain halfback Mick Neil.

References

1957 births
Living people
Western Suburbs Magpies players
Sydney Roosters players
St. George Dragons players
Australian rugby league players
Rugby league halfbacks
Rugby league players from Sydney